The 1995 World Table Tennis Championships mixed doubles was the 43rd edition of the mixed doubles championship.

Wang Tao and Liu Wei defeated Kong Linghui and Deng Yaping in the final by three sets to nil.

Results

See also
List of World Table Tennis Championships medalists

References

-